Punk Chan Kwong-wing (born June 15, 1967), also known as Comfort Chan Kwong-wing, is a music composer for Hong Kong films. Some of his well-known works in films include the Infernal Affairs trilogy, SPL: Sha Po Lang, Initial D,  Daisy, Legend of the Fist: The Return of Chen Zhen, The Last Tycoon, Kung Fu Monster, The Captain, Cook Up a Storm and Chinese Doctors.

Chan has been nominated seventeen times at the Hong Kong Film Awards and has won three awards for scoring The Storm Riders, Bodyguards and Assassins and Wu Xia.

Chan also works as a record producer for Hong Kong singers including Fiona Fung, Pakho Chau and Ekin Cheng.

Awards and nominations 
Hong Kong Film Awards

 Won: Best Original Film Score The Storm Riders
 Nominated: Best Original Film Song The Storm Riders
 Nominated: Best Original Film Score A Man Called Hero
 Nominated: Best Original Film Song A Man Called Hero
 Nominated: Best Original Film ScoreInfernal Affairs
 Nominated: Best Original Film Score Infernal Affairs II
 Nominated: Best Original Film Score Infernal Affairs III
 Nominated: Best Original Film Score Initial D
 Nominated: Best Original Film Score Confession of Pain
 Nominated: Best Original Film Score The Warlords
 Won: Best Original Film Score Bodyguards and Assassins
 Nominated: Best Original Film Song Bodyguards and Assassins
 Nominated: Best Original Film Score A Beautiful Life
 Nominated: Best Original Film Score Overheard 2
 Won: Best Original Film Score Wu Xia
 Nominated: Best Original Film Score The Silent War
 Nominated: Best Original Film Score The Last Tycoon

Fajr International Film Festival

 Won: Best Music Crystal Simorgh The Kingdom of Solomon

Golden Rooster Awards
Won: Best Original Score Chinese Doctors (with Kay Chan)

References

External links 
 
 Click Music Chan Kwong Wing's studio

Living people
1967 births